The 2022 season was the Manchester Originals second season of the 100 ball franchise cricket, The Hundred. The men's team became the second in the competition to score over 200 runs in a single match, scoring 208 runs against the Northern Superchargers, the same fixture in which the Northern Superchargers became the first team to score 200 runs in a match in the competition’s first season. While the women's team performed similarly as the previous season, the men's team improved finishing as runners-up, losing in the final to the Trent Rockets.

Players

Men's side 
 Bold denotes players with international caps.

Women's side 
 Bold denotes players with international caps.

Group fixtures

Fixtures (Men)

Fixtures (Women)
Due to the shortened women's competition, Manchester Originals didn't play against London Spirit.

Standings

Women

 advances to Final
 advances to the Eliminator

Men

 advances to Final
 advances to the Eliminator

Knockout stages

Men

Eliminator

Final

References

The Hundred (cricket)
2022 in English cricket